Admiral Sir Lewis Tobias Jones  (24 December 1797 – 11 October 1895) was a Royal Navy officer who became Commander-in-Chief, Queenstown.

Naval career
Jones became commanding officer of the fifth-rate HMS Penelope in December 1847 and commanding officer of the frigate HMS Sampson in December 1850. In HMS Sampson he saw action in the Black Sea during the Crimean War. He went on to be commanding officer of the second-rate HMS London in November 1854 and commanding officer of the second-rate HMS Princess Royal in August 1855. He went on to be Second-in-command, East Indies and China Station in September 1859 and Commander-in-Chief, Queenstown in March 1862 before he retired in March 1865. In retirement he was Governor of Greenwich Hospital.

Jones died on 11 October 1895 at his home Rugby House in Southsea and was buried in the family vault in the churchyard of Holy Trinity, Fareham.

References

External links

|-

1797 births
1895 deaths
Royal Navy personnel of the Crimean War
Royal Navy admirals
Knights Grand Cross of the Order of the Bath